Kjelt Engbers (born 14 September 1999) is a Dutch professional footballer who plays as a centre-back for the Vierde Divisie club Staphorst.

Professional career
Engbers made his professional debut in a 1–1 Eredivisie tie with SC Heerenveen on 4 November 2018.

On 30 January 2019 FC Emmen announced, that Enbergs had signed with VV Hoogeveen.

In July 2022, Engbers signed with Staphorst in the Vierde Divisie.

References

External links
 

1999 births
Living people
Footballers from Emmen, Netherlands
Dutch footballers
FC Emmen players
Eredivisie players
Vierde Divisie players
Association football defenders
Vv Hoogeveen players